Ridgway is a borough in and the county seat of Elk County, Pennsylvania. As of the 2020 census it had a population of 4,039

History

Ridgway was founded by Philadelphian shipping merchant Jacob Ridgway and James Gillis. Jacob Ridgway earned substantial wealth both in Philadelphia and abroad in London. He constantly sent sums of money back to be invested in property. In the early 19th century as part of a larger land purchase, Ridgway acquired  that became Elk County. One of Jacob Ridgway's nephews, James Gillis, convinced Ridgway that the area could become a very lucrative spot for a lumber camp due to the proximity of Elk Creek and the Clarion River, a tributary of the Allegheny River. Coal and natural gas abound in the district. In the past, the industrial interests were manufacturing leather, iron, clay, and lumber products, silk goods, railroad snow plows, dynamos, and machine tools. In 1900, the people living here numbered 3,515; in 1910, 5,408; in 1940, 6,253, and in 2010, 4,078.

Many historic structures are located within the boundaries of the Ridgway Historic District, added to the National Register of Historic Places in 2003. The O.B. Grant House and Ridgway Armory are also listed on the National Register of Historic Places.

The lumber industry continued to flourish in Ridgway, to the degree that around the start of the 20th century, the town claimed it had more millionaires per capita than any other town in the U.S.

Geography
Ridgway is located in central Elk County at  (41.424739, -78.729733). It is surrounded by Ridgway Township.

The borough is in the valley of the Clarion River, where it is joined from the east by Elk Creek. U.S. Route 219 passes through the borough center, leading north  to Bradford and south  to DuBois.

Climate

Demographics

2010
At the 2010 census there were 4,078 people, 1,783 households, and 1,073 families living in the borough. The population density was 1,568.5 people per square mile (612.7/km²). There were 2,068 housing units at an average density of 795.4 per square mile (310.7/km²). The racial makeup of the borough was 97.7% White, 0.6% African American, 0.1% Native American, 0.6% Asian, 0.1% from other races, and 0.9% from two or more races. Hispanic or Latino of any race were 0.6%.

There were 1,783 households, 26.1% had children under the age of 18 living with them, 45.3% were married couples living together, 9.8% had a female householder with no husband present, and 39.8% were non-families. 35.3% of households were made up of individuals, and 15.1% were one person aged 65 or older. The average household size was 2.25 and the average family size was 2.91.

The age distribution was 22.8% under the age of 18, 59.9% from 18 to 64, and 17.3% 65 or older. The median age was 43 years.

The median household income was $37,917 and the median family income  was $47,969. Males had a median income of $34,629 versus $28,750 for females. The per capita income for the borough was $22,415. About 17.5% of families and 18.1% of the population were below the poverty line, including 39.3% of those under age 18 and 7.2% of those age 65 or over.

2000
At the 2000 census there were 4,591 people, 1,927 households, and 1,233 families living in the borough. The population density was 1,722.7 people per square mile (663.9/km²). There were 2,089 housing units at an average density of 783.8 per square mile (302.1/km²).  The racial makeup of the borough was 98.54% White, 0.17% African American, 0.04% Native American, 0.70% Asian, 0.17% from other races, and 0.37% from two or more races. Hispanic or Latino of any race were 0.52%.

There were 1,927 households, 28.4% had children under the age of 18 living with them, 50.1% were married couples living together, 9.7% had a female householder with no husband present, and 36.0% were non-families. 31.7% of households were made up of individuals, and 16.8% were one person aged 65 or older. The average household size was 2.33 and the average family size was 2.94.

The age distribution was 22.9% under the age of 18, 8.2% from 18 to 24, 27.8% from 25 to 44, 22.8% from 45 to 64, and 18.3% 65 or older. The median age was 40 years. For every 100 females there were 91.2 males. For every 100 females age 18 and over, there were 89.3 males.

The median household income was $33,141 and the median family income  was $45,224. Males had a median income of $31,855 versus $21,296 for females. The per capita income for the borough was $17,157. About 4.9% of families and 6.1% of the population were below the poverty line, including 8.9% of those under age 18 and 2.3% of those age 65 or over.

Art and culture 
Ridgway is home to the Ridgway Chainsaw Carving Rendezvous, the largest chainsaw carving gathering of its kind. In the summer months, the Ridgway Volunteer Fire Department host their week-long celebration on their lot off North Broad Street. The Ridgway Heritage Council hosts the Tasting in the Wilds Festival, which is full of art, music, local wine tastings, and handcrafted brews.

The Elk County Council on the Arts (ECCOTA) has been serving the area with art experiences, education, and resources since 1984. ECCOTA operates a sales gallery in downtown Ridgway with artwork of all mediums from local artists.

Recreation 
The area serves as a gateway to the Allegheny National Forest, which provides outdoor recreation activities including ATV trails, horseback riding, camping and fishing. Ridgway has several bed and breakfasts, the Summit Fireside Lodge and Grill, and the oldest hotel in Elk County, the Royal Inn. The Wild and Scenic Clarion River hosts trophy trout fishing, an afternoon float and camping. The Little Toby-Clarion River Rail Trail trek runs  to Brockway.

Education 
Ridgway houses two school systems in the borough and township. The Ridgway Area School District and St. Leo's Catholic School make up Ridgway's school systems.

Ridgway Area School District 
Ridgway Area School District (RASD), has an elementary and a middle/high school building.

The Francis S. Grandinetti Elementary School is on Boot Jack Hill in Ridgway Township. IU9 preschool, kindergarten, 1st grade, 2nd grade, 3rd grade, 4th grade, and 5th grade are the grade levels available for students.

The Ridgway Area Middle/High School is at 1403 Hill Street in Ridgway. The middle school and high school students are on separate floors. The middle school, grades six through eight, are on the first floor. Students in high school, grades nine to twelve, are on the second floor.

The athletic team is known as the Elkers, a reference to Ridgway as the Elk County seat.

St. Leo's Catholic School 

St. Leo's Catholic School has two buildings, a building for kindergarten students, and a main building, for children in grades 1-8. The kindergarten building is located just to the right of the main building. The preschool building is located to the left of the main building. 
The main building at St. Leo's educates children from grades 1-8. After completing 8th grade, students have the choice to transfer to public school (see above) or to transfer to Elk County Catholic High School, in St. Marys.

Notable people
 Tom Brown, American football player.
 Mary Elizabeth Lease, writer and political activist.
 Katherine Mayo, writer
 Billy Rhines, professional baseball player with the Cincinnati Reds, Louisville Colonels, and Pittsburgh Pirates.
 Emil Van Horn, actor and stunt man,

Awards and recognition 

 "Best small town to visit in Pennsylvania this Fall" in 2019 according to Thrillist. 
 The Clarion River, named 2019 Pennsylvania's River of the Year.
 The Ridgway Area High School named a Blue Ribbon High School during the 2019 school year.

References

External links

Borough of Ridgway official website
Ridgway-Elk County Chamber of Commerce

County seats in Pennsylvania
1881 establishments in Pennsylvania
Boroughs in Elk County, Pennsylvania
Boroughs in Pennsylvania
Populated places established in 1822